The greater bandicoot rat or Indian bandicoot rat (Bandicota indica) is a species of rodent in the family Muridae found in Bangladesh, China, India, Indonesia, Laos, Malaysia, Myanmar, Nepal, Sri Lanka, Taiwan, Thailand, and Vietnam[Pakistan].
It can grow to about 27–29 cm without including the tail which can grow to 28 cm. These should not be confused with marsupial bandicoots which inhabit Australia and neighbouring New Guinea, which were named after the bandicota rats.

Description

The greater bandicoot rat has a dark gray-brown upper parts with a profusion of long, black hairs. Sides are gray with a few long, black hairs. Short, light gray fur occurs on the ventral surfaces. It has a dark and naked, scaly tail, and dark feet with light-colored claws. The young are much lighter in colour. 
In Sri Lanka, the bandicoot rat is known as  -  in the Sinhala language, the meaning of which directly translates to "pig-rat". These are one of several animals called  in the Nepali language.

Reproduction
A female has between 8 and 10 litters during her life. The young (8–14 rat pups per litter) are born blind and naked. Young reach sexual maturity around 50 to 60 days after birth. The lifespan of adults is around a year.

Behaviour
Large, aggressive bandicoot rats erect their guard hairs on their backs and emit grunts when disturbed. If caged with other bandicoots, it is likely to fight to death within a few hours. They're so aggressive that sometimes dogs and cats are afraid of these bandicoot rat, they occupy the outskirts of human dwellings such as compounds and gardens and are commonly found near garbage bins. They are also sometimes found on the roadside. Sometimes they get run over by cars and die on the road. Burrowing habits cause great damage to grounds and flooring, as they can also tunnel through brick and masonry. Their characteristic large burrows give away their presence. They are not fastidious eaters, feeding on household refuse, grain, and vegetables, and are very serious pests in poultry farms. They are also a carrier for many diseases.

Parasites 
Parasites of Bandicota indica include:
 Schistosoma spindale
 Angiostrongylus cantonensis

Rat-borne diseases 
 Leptospirosis
 Hantavirus
 Babesiosis
 Bovine schistosomiasis.

References

External links
 
 

Bandicota
Rats of Asia
Mammals of Nepal
Rodents of India
Mammals of Sri Lanka
Mammals described in 1800
Taxonomy articles created by Polbot